Acrotaeniostola helvenaca is a species of tephritid or fruit flies in the genus Acrotaeniostola of the family Tephritidae.

Distribution
Japan.

References

Tephritinae
Insects described in 1984
Diptera of Asia